Holy Hell is the debut album from Noun, the solo project of Marissa Paternoster of Screaming Females. The album was released by Don Giovanni Records in 2010.

Track listing
 Black Lamb
 Outer Space
 Holy Hell
 Wrong Things
 Pearly Gates
 Call Earth
 Old Friends
 So Rough
 Brother
 Talk

References

2010 albums
Don Giovanni Records albums